The two-tower skyscraper Sea Towers is a mixed-use  complex on the Gdynia waterfront, Poland, 50 metres from the main port of Gdynia developed by Invest Komfort SA. Tourist attractions such as the beach, boardwalk and retired Polish WWII naval ship ORP Błyskawica (lightning) are all within walking distance. Construction commenced on 10 May 2006 and was completed on 28 February 2009. At 143.6 metres, Sea Towers is the 14th tallest building in Poland and the second tallest residential building in the country. Apartments are for sale, and the complex can double as a hotel. There is a viewing terrace on floor 32, the top floor of the taller tower.

See also 
 List of tallest buildings in Poland

References 
 

Buildings and structures in Gdynia
Skyscrapers in Poland
Residential skyscrapers in Poland
Twin towers
Residential buildings completed in 2009